The silverstripe shiner (Notropis stilbius) is a species of cyprinid freshwater fish endemic to the United States where it is widespread in Mobile Bay drainage in Mississippi, Alabama, Tennessee and Georgia.

References 

 

Notropis
Fish described in 1877
Taxa named by David Starr Jordan